Borkovice is a municipality and village in Tábor District in the South Bohemian Region of the Czech Republic. It has about 200 inhabitants.

Notable people
Jiří Beránek (1945–2021), sculptor and painter

References

Villages in Tábor District